Cristóforo Chrisostome Carletti (1 April 1564 – 1634) was a Roman Catholic prelate who served as Auxiliary Bishop of Calahorra y La Calzada (1624–1634) and Bishop of Termia (1622–1627).

Biography
Cristóforo Chrisostome Carletti was born on 1 April 1564 in Capranica, Lazio, Italy and ordained a priest in the Order of Friars Minor. On 23 May 1622, he was appointed during the papacy of Pope Gregory XV as Bishop of Termia. On 29 May 1622, he was consecrated bishop by Marco Antonio Gozzadini, Cardinal-Priest of Sant'Eusebio, with Petrus Salinates, Bishop of Sardica, and Benedikt Orsini, Bishop of Lezhë, as co-consecrators. In 1624, he was appointed during the papacy of Pope Urban VIII as Auxiliary Bishop of Calahorra y La Calzada. In 1627, he resigned as Bishop of Termia and in 1634, he resigned as Auxiliary Bishop of Calahorra y La Calzada.

Episcopal succession
While bishop, he was the principal co-consecrator of:

References 

17th-century Roman Catholic bishops in the Republic of Venice
Bishops appointed by Pope Gregory XV
Bishops appointed by Pope Urban VIII
1564 births
1634 deaths